The Portuguese Gold Coast was a Portuguese colony on the West African Gold Coast (present-day Ghana) along the Gulf of Guinea. Established in 1482, the colony was officially incorporated into Dutch territory in 1642 following Portugal’s defeat in the Dutch-Portuguese War. From their seat of power at the fortress of São Jorge da Mina (located in modern Elmina), the Portuguese commanded a vast internal slave trade, creating a slave network that would expand after the end of Portuguese colonialism in the region. The primary export of the colony was gold, which was obtained through barter with the local population. Portuguese presence along the Gold Coast increased seamanship and trade in the Gulf, introduced American crops (such as maize and cassava) into the African agricultural landscape, and made Portuguese an enduring language of trade in the area.

History

Portuguese arrival on the Gold Coast 
In 1471, Portuguese explorers encountered fishing villages rich with ivory and gold along the Atlantic coast of modern-day Ghana, which the Portuguese called the Gold Coast. The prospect of trade in the Gold Coast region helped spur the construction of the fortress São Jorge da Mina (St. George of the Mine) in 1482, which soon came to be known as Elmina Castle, derived from the Portuguese term "el mina" ("the mine"). The castle was erected near a populated African town which was also called Elmina. The Other major Portuguese settlements on the Gold Coast included the following:

 Fort Santo António de Axim, modern Axim: established 1515
 Fort São Francisco Xavier, modern Osu, a district of Accra: established c.1557—c.1578
 Fort São Sebastião, modern Shama: established 1558

The Portuguese decision to construct the fortress at Elmina was influenced by a pre-established trade system between native Elminans and Portuguese merchants in the area. A natural peninsula, enclosed by the Atlantic and the Benya river, was chosen as the site of construction for Elmina Castle to maximize defensibility. A nobleman named Diogo de Azambuja was appointed by the Portuguese king, John II, to construct the coastal fortress. To maintain peace with the native peoples of Elmina, Azambuja entered into negotiations with the native leader Caramansa over their plans to construct Elmina Castle. In a discussion facilitated by a Portuguese merchant and aided by a native translator, Caramansa reacted skeptically to the proposition, as several African homes would have to be destroyed for construction on the castle to begin. After the Portuguese threatened violence, Caramansa met Portuguese demands. However, he prohibited the use of sacred local rock, known to the native Elminans as Kokobo, and forbid the Portuguese from accessing the natives’ freshwater supply. Portuguese settlers, defying Caramansa's demands, mined Kokobo rock for construction purposes. Doing so upset the local population, yet conflict was avoided after the Portuguese bestowed gifts upon the native Elminans. Once constructed, Elmina Castle represented the first major European construction in sub-Saharn Africa and is currently recognized as a UNESCO World Heritage Site.

In order to establish good trade relationships with neighboring African nations, the Portuguese frequently extended gifts to the leaders of interior states, including to the Eguafo state to which Elmina belonged. Their strategy along the coast, however, entailed using force against Africans to prevent them from trading with European competitors. Portuguese violence along the coast soured their relations with neighboring African states; as such, the Portuguese lacked sufficient manpower to enforce their rule across the entire Gulf of Guinea. Portuguese influence along the Gold Coast extended from an area near modern-day New Town, Ghana, in the west to the historic settlement of Adda (near modern-day Denu, Ghana) in the east. Other European nations conducting trade in the Gulf, including the English and Dutch, offered lower-priced commodities than the Portuguese, driving many Africans to accept the risk of Portuguese retaliation in order to yield a larger profit from trade.

Dutch competition 
Competition with European powers coupled with the decline of Portugal’s economic might in the early 1600s led to a waning of Portuguese influence in the Gold Coast region. Spurred by reports of the successful Portuguese gold trade in the Gulf of Guinea, Dutch forces began mobilizing against the Portuguese in an effort to wrest control of the region and monopolize the gold trade. In 1625, the Dutch West India Company initiated an attack on São Jorge da Mina, which stood as the trading hub for the Portuguese in West Africa. The Dutch fleet was made up of the combined forces of Captain Jan Dircksz Lam and the remaining ships from Boudewijn Hendricksz’s failed venture in Salvador against the Spanish. On October 25, 1625, the Dutch were ambushed by Portuguese forces and their African allies, which were persuaded to join the fight after the Portuguese promised them compensation. After incurring heavy losses, the Dutch were expelled from the area in what became known as the Battle of Elmina (1625).

In August of 1637, the Dutch West India Company again targeted Elmina, which they saw as both the seat of Portuguese power in the Gulf of Guinea and a potential foothold into the African slave trade. To aid in the conflict, known as the second Battle of Elmina (1637), the Dutch encouraged members of the Elmina, Komenda, and Efutu states to turn against the Portuguese. After gaining some local support, the Dutch were better equipped to take on the opposing Portuguese forces and succeeded in capturing a hill facing the fort of Elmina. After enduring days of cannon fire, the Portuguese conceded, and Elmina castle officially came under Dutch control on August 29, 1637. Without their stronghold in Elmina, the Portuguese were completely expelled from the region by 1642.

Donatary captains 
Donatary captain (donatário, or Captain-major) was a designation given by the Portuguese Crown to an official tasked with overseeing colonial territory. The following is a list of the known donatary captaincies in São Jorge da Mina:

Economy
The Portuguese imported slaves to Elmina throughout the sixteenth century, using them primarily to transport goods to and from interior African states, but also to exchange with local Elminans for gold. The main supply of Gold Coast slaves came from the trade route between Benin and Elmina, which also supplied the Portuguese with important commodities such as cotton, cloth, and beads. The slave trade was later expanded to encompass the Niger River delta and the island of São Tome. Cloth, linens, beads, copper and brass pots, pans, bracelets, and slaves were all used as bartering tools to obtain gold from the native merchants of Elmina. Elmina's gold originated from the Asante and Denkyira regions of modern-day Ghana and became the dominant export from the colony along with, to a lesser extent, ivory. Additionally, the inflow of foreign crops into the Gold Coast region globalized the region's agricultural practices and output, introducing sugar, maize, guava, sweet potatoes, coconut, yams, and cassava to the African agricultural landscape. Further, the dominance of the Portuguese trade route along the Gulf Coast in the sixteenth century led to Portuguese becoming the principal language of exchange in the Gulf of Guinea. The language has endured in the area despite the presence of other European powers in the Gulf after the colony was ceded in 1642.

Legacy 
The internal African slave trade established by the Portuguese laid the groundwork for the vast networks of human trafficking that would flourish in the region during the centuries to come, as the Dutch and, later, the British capitalized on pre-established trade routes during the Atlantic slave trade. Further, the shipping might of the Portuguese encouraged new, long-distance river trading amidst West African states, and the volume of trade along the Gulf of Guinea increased as a result of Portuguese presence. Boatbuilding became an important craft that accompanied an increase in coastal trade and seamanship in the Gulf. After generations of intimate contact with local African dialects, Portuguese creole emerged as an important language of trade along the Gulf Coast, second only to Portuguese itself. Further, interbreeding between Portuguese and Africans led to a sizable mixed-race population along the Gold Coast.

Urbanization occurred around Elmina, spurred partly by Portuguese attempts to establish a municipality in the area. Native governors, known as braffos, were given authority by the Portuguese, and migration from the interior to coastal regions increased.  The cultivation of maize and cassava, first introduced to the region by the Portuguese through trans-Atlantic trade, flourished in the Gold Coast and became dietary staples throughout West Africa. Further, Portuguese contact and activity along the Gold Coast integrated the region into the global economy. The larger trade volume in the region centralized the small, distinct states that existed prior to Portuguese contact into larger political entities. The advent of global trade in the Gold Coast also consolidated commercial activity in coastal cities, which connected inland African communities with European trade.

References

External links
WorldStatesmen.org:  Portuguese Gold Coast

 
History of Ghana
Former colonies in Africa
Gold Coast
Gold Coast
Portuguese Gold Coast
15th century in Ghana
16th century in Ghana
17th century in Ghana
15th century in the Portuguese Empire
16th century in the Portuguese Empire
17th century in the Portuguese Empire
15th-century establishments in Africa
1642 disestablishments in Africa
1482 establishments in the Portuguese Empire
1642 disestablishments in the Portuguese Empire